The Omaha Bolt, Nut and Screw Building is a warehouse building at in Omaha, Nebraska, that was built in 1889.  It was designed by architect Henry Voss for the Omaha Bolt, Nut & Screw Company, a hardware distributor based in Omaha.  It was listed on the National Register of Historic Places in 1992 as part of a multiple property submission with other warehouses in Omaha that were part of an economically important "wholesale jobbing" industry that sprang up, taking advantage of Omaha's location and transportation links.

References

Commercial buildings on the National Register of Historic Places in Nebraska
Romanesque Revival architecture in Nebraska
Commercial buildings completed in 1889
Buildings and structures in Omaha, Nebraska
Warehouses in the United States
National Register of Historic Places in Omaha, Nebraska